Sergio Mestre (born 30 August 1991) is a Cuban male track and field athlete who competes in the high jump. He was the gold medallist in the event at the 2014 Central American and Caribbean Games. He has also been a finalist at the 2015 Pan American Games and the 2015 NACAC Championships in Athletics.

International competitions

National titles
Cuban Athletics Championships
High jump: 2012, 2015

References

External links



Living people
1991 births
Cuban male high jumpers
Pan American Games competitors for Cuba
Athletes (track and field) at the 2015 Pan American Games
Central American and Caribbean Games gold medalists for Cuba
Competitors at the 2014 Central American and Caribbean Games
Central American and Caribbean Games medalists in athletics
21st-century Cuban people